ILB may refer to:

 I Love Bees, an alternate reality game
 Inflation-linked bond, see inflation-indexed bond, a financial debt instrument
 Inside linebacker, a position in American football
 Inshore lifeboat, a type of lifeboat rescue vehicles 
 Inbound load balancing, a form of network load balancing
 Irish Lighthouse Board, see Commissioners of Irish Lights
 internationales literaturfestival berlin, Berlin International Literature Festival
 "Intentionally left blank"